The Globe Theatre (est. 1903) was a playhouse and cinema in Boston, Massachusetts, located on Washington Street in Chinatown. Architect Arthur H. Vinal designed the building in 1903; it stands today at no.692 Washington St. opposite LaGrange Street, near the corner of Beach Street. In the 1910s it was also known as "Loew's Globe Theatre."

Performances/Screenings

1900s
 Weber and Fields' "An English Daisy"
 "In Dahomey," with Williams & Walker
 "Pals," with James J. Corbett
 "Under Southern Skies"
 "1492"

1910s
 D.W. Griffith's Intolerance

1920s
 Monroe Salisbury and Shirley Mason in "new photoplays"
 Smilin' Through

References

External links

 Library of Congress. Globe Theatre (Globe Grand Opera), Washington St. near La Grange St., Boston, Massachusetts. Illustration by Anthony F. Dumas, 1931.
 Flickr.
 Photo of Empire Garden interior, 2010; building formerly housed the Globe theatre
 Photo of Empire Garden ceiling, 2010
 Photo of Empire Garden exterior, 2008

Images

Cultural history of Boston
20th century in Boston
Boston Theater District
1903 establishments in Massachusetts
Former theatres in Boston
Event venues established in 1903
Former cinemas in the United States
Chinatown, Boston
Loew's Theatres buildings and structures
Theatres completed in 1903